Ridgley Methodist Episcopal Church, constructed in 1921, is a one-story frame church on the north side of Central Avenue in Landover, Prince George's County, Maryland. The church was founded in 1871 and a cemetery begun in 1892.  It served as the spiritual and social center of the formerly rural African American farming community of Ridgley.

The gable-front church consists of a 1921 block on the south and a small 1940s extension on the north. The church was moved from its original location to its current location in 1990. In 2002, the church suffered a fire that destroyed the original plaster. The cemetery has about 20 mostly hand carved gravestones with flower and vine motif, arranged in orderly rows and grouped by families. The stones date from the 1910s to the 1940s.  It is currently home to New Rock Church.

It was listed on the National Register of Historic Places in 2005.

References

External links
, including photo in 2003, at Maryland Historical Trust website

Churches in Prince George's County, Maryland
Landover, Maryland
Churches on the National Register of Historic Places in Maryland
African-American history of Prince George's County, Maryland
African Methodist Episcopal churches in Maryland
Churches completed in 1921
19th-century Methodist church buildings in the United States
Religious organizations established in 1871
1871 establishments in Maryland
National Register of Historic Places in Prince George's County, Maryland